The Royal Danish egg (also known as the Danish Jubilee egg) is a jewelled enameled Easter egg made under the supervision of the Russian jeweller Peter Carl Fabergé in 1903, for Nicholas II of Russia, who presented the egg to his mother, the Dowager Empress Maria Feodorovna.  One of six Fabergé eggs that are currently lost, it is one of two eggs whose existence is known only from a single photograph, the other being 1909's Alexander III Commemorative egg. A partially obscured photograph of the lost 1888 egg Cherub with Chariot may also exist.

Surprise
The egg contains miniature portraits of Christian IX of Denmark and his wife, Louise of Hesse-Kassel (or Hesse-Cassel), the parents of the Dowager Empress Maria Feodorovna.

History
The egg is known from a description published in The Connoisseur magazine in June, 1934:

"Miniatures of the late King of Denmark and his Queen are framed as the surprise feature in the Imperial egg. The outer surface is in light blue and white enamel with ornaments in gold and precious stones. On the top are the armorial bearings of the Danish Royal Family, and it is supported by Danish heraldic lions." 

One of the largest Fabergé eggs at over nine inches (229 mm) in height, the egg is crowned by the symbol of Denmark's ancient Order of the Elephant.

In 1903 the Dowager Empress Maria Feodorovna, born in Denmark as Princess Dagmar, returned to Denmark for the 40th Anniversary of her father's accession to the throne. The Royal Danish egg was thus a commemoration of this event and at the same time to commemorate the death of Queen Louise. Nicholas II wrote to his mother in Copenhagen that he was "sending you a Fabergé Easter present. I hope it will arrive safely; it simply opens from the top".

See also
Egg decorating
List of missing treasure

References

Sources

Lost Fabergé eggs
1903 works